The 1995 Southwestern Louisiana Ragin' Cajuns football team was an American football team that represented the University of Southwestern Louisiana (now known as the University of Louisiana at Lafayette) in the Big West Conference during the 1995 NCAA Division I-A football season. In their tenth year under head coach Nelson Stokley, the team compiled an 6–5 record.

Schedule

References

Southwestern Louisiana
Louisiana Ragin' Cajuns football seasons
Southwestern Louisiana Ragin' Cajuns football